Ambert (Auvergnat: Embèrt) is a commune in the Puy-de-Dôme department in Auvergne in central France.

Administration
Ambert is the seat of the canton of Ambert and the arrondissement of Ambert. It is a sub-prefecture of the department. The arrondissement consists of eight cantons (before March 2015).

Geography
Ambert lies on the river Dore, a tributary of the Allier.

Population

Sights
Ambert is famous for its fourme d'Ambert cheese - "Fourme d'Ambert", its paper mills - "Le moulin Richard de Bas" - (the first edition of Diderot's Encyclopédie was printed on paper made in Ambert) and its circular town market hall - "La Mairie" -  (popularized by Jules Romains in his novel Les copains).

The Agrivap Chemin de Fer Touristique operates out of Ambert. There is a steam engine that makes a local run, but to see the line in full a ride on the Panoramique Autorail is not to be missed.

There is an industrial museum with an interesting collection of tractors and small steam engines.

In the town the Museum of Cheese is worth a visit, as is the old paper mill a few kilometres outside the main town.

Personalities
Ambert was the birthplace of the mathematician Michel Rolle (1652–1719), composer Emmanuel Chabrier (1841–1894), and anthropologist Henri Pourrat (1887-1959), who collected the oral traditions of the Auvergne. It is also the birthplace of actor and director Pierre-Loup Rajot (1958–).

International relations
Ambert is twinned with:
 Annweiler, Germany, since 1988
 Higashichichibu, Saitama, Japan, since 1989
 Gorgonzola, Italy, since 2002. Both cities, known for their blue cow's-milk cheeses (cheese and Fourme d'Ambert), have almost the same latitude: 45° 32' N for Gorgonzola, 45° 33' N for Ambert.

Touristic places near Ambert 
Some semi-famous places to go when visiting Ambert, France are:
 La Mairie (a round town hall, fun when the farmer's market is there)
 Le Moulin Richard-de-Bas (a paper mill, with a great tour for all ages, workshops, activities and a nice little garden)

See also
Communes of the Puy-de-Dôme department

References

Communes of Puy-de-Dôme
Subprefectures in France
Auvergne